Mario Ervedosa (born 28 May 1998) is an Angolan swimmer. He competed in the men's 50 metre breaststroke event at the 2017 World Aquatics Championships.

References

1998 births
Living people
Angolan male swimmers
Place of birth missing (living people)
Male breaststroke swimmers